The Caves of King "Cintolo" (Galician: Covas do Rei Cintolo, Spanish: Cueva del Rey Cintolo) are a group of caves, of more than 7,500 meters length, in the outskirts of the City of Mondoñedo, Spain.

Of limestone formation, they include numerous stalactites and stalagmites. They were discovered by archaeologist José Villaamil y Castro in 1870.

External links 
  Descriptive Web-site of The Caves of King "Cintolo" in Mondoñedo 

Cintolo
Cintolo
Cintolo
Landforms of Galicia (Spain)